Peter Ehrlich (25 March 1933 – 26 July 2015) was a German television actor.

Filmography

References

External links
 
 Verena de la Berg Agency Munich 

1933 births
2015 deaths
German male television actors
20th-century German male actors
21st-century German male actors
Actors from Leipzig